Niklas Krog is a Swedish author of a number of young-adult novels within the High Fantasy genre.

Biography
Niklas Krog was born in 1965, in Lund, Sweden. He later relocated with his family to Alvik in Stockholm, at the age of eight. In Alvik, Krog joined a local basketball-team and competed in Europe, and his team won several times. Krog had good grades from his highschool, although school never interested him much. Instead he liked sports and continued to play basketball and competed for some a time in the Swedish Championship. But eventually Krog chose to quit sports and focus on a literary career. Krog made his debut in 1996 with "Under guds himmel" which literally translates to Beneath the sky of God.

Personal life
Niklas Krog met his wife, Elizabeth, when he was fourteen years old. They have two children.

Bibliography

Trilogin om Frihetskrigen (The Trilogy of the Wars of Peace) 
 En krigares hjärta (1997)
 En magikers styrka (1999)
 En härskares själ (2001)
 Den stora fredens krig (2004) - continuation of the Wars of Peace Unadan
 Tanarog Yxkämpen (2007) - continuation of Unadan's childhood
 Krigarens väg (2007) - continuation of En krigares hjärta

Janus 
 Gudarnas son (2000)
 Till världens ände (2001)
 Den sista striden (2002)
 Kampen om tronen  (2006)

Yumi och den magiska världen Loophole 
 Loophole: Drakmagi och saftsmugglare (2004)
 Loophole - Magiväktare och sköldpaddspirater (2006)

Trilogin om Biko - Krigare utan minne (The Trilogy of Biko - Warrior without memory) 
 Krigare utan minne (2008)
 I krigarens spår (2010)
 Krigarens sista strid (2010)

Turk and Ayla 
 Ingen rädsla (2008)
 Turk & Ayla (2010)
 Turk & Ayla - Sista skottet (2011)
 Turk & Timotej, En natt (2012)

Legenden om Tann (The Legend of Tann) 
 Legenden om Tann - Skogsflickan (2010)
 Legenden om Tann - Bestens håla (2010)
 Legenden om Tann - Drakmötet (2011)
 Legenden om Tann - Nidaros vrede (2011)
 Legenden om Tann - Dräparen (2012)
 Legenden om Tann - Havet (2012)

Easy-reading fantasy 
 Draksvärdet (2000)
 Häxmästarens skugga (2003) - continuation of Draksvärdet
 Det mystiska skeppet (2005)
 Det magiska molnet (2007) - continuation of Det mystiska skeppet

Others 
 Under Guds himmel (1996)
 Jor & Ka (1998)
 Den röda planeten (2000)

References

External links 
 Niklas Krogs officiella webbplats
 Författarförmedlingen - Niklas Krog

Swedish fantasy writers
1965 births
Living people
Alviks BK players
Swedish basketball players
People from Lund Municipality